The West Water Tower and Ground Storage Tank are a historic water tower and storage tank located at 310 11th Avenue in Orion, Illinois. The tower and tank were built in 1928 as part of the village's new water system, which had been approved the previous year. The water system was introduced both as a response to several fires which had plagued the village and as an effort to bring modern technology and progress, among other civic concerns. The ground storage tank, located at the base of the tower, is made of redwood and holds  of water.

The structures were added to the National Register of Historic Places on February 5, 2003.

References

Industrial buildings and structures on the National Register of Historic Places in Illinois
Buildings and structures completed in 1928
National Register of Historic Places in Henry County, Illinois
Water towers in Illinois
Water towers on the National Register of Historic Places in Illinois